This is a list of public art in Covent Garden, a district in the City of Westminster and the London Borough of Camden.

City of Westminster

London Borough of Camden

References

Bibliography

 

 

Covent Garden
Public art